This is a list of all the diplomatic missions in Madagascar. There are currently 22 embassies and one consulate general in Antananarivo.

Diplomatic missions in Antananarivo

Embassies

Other missions or delegations
 (Delegation)
 (Embassy office)

Gallery

Consular missions

Antananarivo
 (Consulate-General)

Antsiranana
 (Consular office)

Mahajanga
 Consulate
 (Consular office)

Toamasina
 (Consular office)

Non-resident embassies

Resident in Maputo, Mozambique

Resident in Nairobi, Kenya

Resident in Pretoria, South Africa

Resident in other cities

Closed missions

See also
Foreign relations of Madagascar
List of diplomatic missions of Madagascar

Notes

References

External links
 Malagasy Ministry of Foreign Affairs

Diplomatic missions
Madagascar
Diplomatic missions